Canon Slade School is a coeducational Church of England secondary school and sixth form located in Bradshaw in the Metropolitan Borough of Bolton, Greater Manchester, England.

History

The school was founded in 1855 by Canon James Slade as Bolton Church Institute, aimed at educating the poorer children of Bolton. The Church Institute was on Institute Street. Offices and the Society of Friends Meeting House occupy the original site next to St Peter's Church. The school moved to its current site on Bradshaw Brow in 1956. The school holds its annual Founder's Day service at St Peter's.

The school became a direct grant grammar school, then a comprehensive. It celebrated its 150th anniversary in 2005 with a ceremony at the Bolton Arena. A range of items including a brief history - created by historian John Aldred - and a whole school photograph were produced to commemorate the occasion.

About the school
The school has around 1,700 pupils on roll, including 340 in the sixth form. It has a reputation for its academic work, for several years the sixth form has been ranked amongst the top thirty nationally for A-level results in a comprehensive state school, and also for sport (Sportsmark Award and regular success in national competitions), for music, drama and other activities. It was a Specialist Arts College and is a Training School and has Healthy School and Leading Edgy status. Since 2004 the school has been an Ambassador School for the National Academy of Gifted and Talented Youth. In 2009 the school was awarded Gold Standard by the Specialist School and Academies Trust for Community Cohesion.

Canon Slade School is set on a  site in the foothills of the West Pennine Moors on which are hundreds of mature trees, a river bank, two wildlife ponds, one of which is inhabited by several endangered species of amphibian, extensive sports fields, including a cross-country course and floodlit all-weather pitch.

Previously a voluntary aided school administered by Bolton Metropolitan Borough Council, in December 2017 Canon Slade School converted to academy status. The school is now sponsored by The Bishop Fraser Trust.

Admissions
The governors' policy on admissions is to give priority to children from committed Christian families. The number of intended admissions each year to Year 7 is now 300. Pupils are admitted without reference to ability and aptitude except in the case of applicants to the sixth form. To gain access to the sixth form candidates must hold a minimum of five GCSEs at grades 9 - 6 including English Language and Mathematics.

Sixth form
The sixth form centre is Ashworth House. More than 50% of Year 11 pupils join the sixth form where there are around 340 pupils on roll.

In 2011, 94% of pupils who applied gained a place at university, 79% got a place in their first choice university, A Level passes were at 99.5% of which 25% were A* or A.

The range of A Level subjects offered includes Art and Design, Biology, Chemistry, Classical Civilisation, Computing, Dance, Design Technology, Drama and Theatre Studies, Economics and Business Studies, English Language, English Language and Literature, English Literature, Environmental Science, Film Studies, Food Technology, French, General Studies, Geography, Geology, German, History, Information and Communication Technology, Law, Mathematics: Further, Pure and Applied, Mathematics: Pure and Mechanics, Mathematics: Pure and Statistics, Music, Music Technology, Performing Arts, Physical Education, Physics, Psychology, Religious Studies, Sociology and Spanish. There is also AS Critical Thinking and the Extended Project Qualification (EPQ). The more vocational Advanced Creative and Media Diploma (worth 3.5 A-Levels) is also available.

As of the academic term for 2019, Music Technology was no longer offered.

Notable former pupils

Bolton Church Institute
 William Lever, 1st Viscount Leverhulme (1851–1925), industrialist and philanthropist

Canon Slade Grammar School
 Alyn Ainsworth (1924–1990), Bandleader.
 Angela Harris, Baroness Harris of Richmond (born 1944), Liberal Democrat life peer and a Deputy Speaker in the House of Lords.
 Basil Stanley Moss (1918–2006), Provost of Birmingham Cathedral from 1972 to 1986.
 John Stuart Sexton (born 1948), Sports Journalist Britain's Racing Journalist of the Year 1991

Canon Slade School
 Simon Aldred (born 1975), lead singer, guitarist and songwriter with band Cherry Ghost.
 Niamh Blackshaw (born 1999), actress known for playing Juliet Nightingale in Channel 4's Hollyoaks.
 Katy Cavanagh (born 1973), actress.
 Mark Charnock (born 1968), actor known for playing Marlon Dingle in ITV's  Emmerdale.
 Sara Cox (born 1974), radio presenter (6th form).
 Ashley Fletcher (born 1995), professional footballer for Watford F.C.
 Julie Foy (born 1971), actress and producer, Assistant Producer of Academy Award-winning short film The Silent Child.
 Tom Glynn-Carney (born 1995), actor. 
 Lilian Greenwood (born 1966), Labour politician. MP for Nottingham South from 2010.
 Ruth Higham (born 1978), Page Three model.
 Keith Hill (born 1969), professional football manager.
 Matt Parkinson (born 1996), professional international cricketer for England and Lancashire (6th form).
 Callum Parkinson (born 1996), professional cricketer for Leicestershire (6th form).
 Maxine Peake (born 1974), actress.
 Jimmy Phillips (born 1966), professional footballer
 Jack Walton (born 1998), professional footballer for Barnsley F.C.
 Laurence Wyke (born 1996), professional footballer for Atlanta United FC.

References

External links
 Canon Slade School
 Bolton Church Institute School War Memorial

Educational institutions established in 1855
1855 establishments in England
Church of England secondary schools in the Diocese of Manchester
Secondary schools in the Metropolitan Borough of Bolton
People educated at Canon Slade School
Academies in the Metropolitan Borough of Bolton